Columbia Center is the tallest skyscraper in Seattle.

Columbia Center may also refer to:
 Columbia Centre, a landmark office building in Bracknell, Berkshire, England
 Columbia Center (Troy), twin towers in Troy, Michigan
 Columbia Center, a shopping mall in Kennewick, Washington
 Columbia Center, Ohio, an unincorporated community
 Columbia Center, New York, a hamlet in Herkimer County, New York

See also 
 Columbia Building (disambiguation)